Phenacemide (INN, BAN) (brand name Phenurone), also known as phenylacetylurea, is an anticonvulsant of the ureide (acetylurea) class. It is a congener and ring-opened analogue of phenytoin (a hydantoin), and is structurally related to the barbiturates and to other hydantoins. Phenacemide was introduced in 1949 for the treatment of epilepsy, but was eventually withdrawn due to toxicity.

See also
 Pheneturide

References

External links
 
 
 
 

Imides
Ureas
Withdrawn drugs